misfits.strangers.liars.friends was the major label debut of the Canadian rap rock group Project Wyze which included the hit singles "Room To Breathe" and "Nothing's What It Seems". The tracks "Nothing's What It Seems", "Denial", "Erica", "Eyes Wide Shut" & "Strangers Among Us" all were originally released on Project Wyze's Only If I Knew - EP but were redone for their major debut release.

Track listing

2001 albums
Project Wyze albums